Thera Para is a 2018 Malayalam mini web series created by Nikhil Prasad for his YouTube channel Karikku. The web series revolves around the lives of four energetic young men and their struggles to become successful. The main four characters - George, Lolan, Shibu and Shambu are roommates. Three of them are unemployed and B.Tech graduates. Shibu is the only one who is employed in the group.

The series lasted for 20 episodes. The first episode titled Ithaanu Avastha (Transl. This is the situation) was released on 21 July 2018 and the last episode - Ivide theerunilla (Transl. 'It doesn't end here) on 23 March 2019.

After the season finale, on July 7, 2019, the Karikku team announced their decision to produce a movie - Thera Para - The Movie'' by sharing a motion poster on YouTube.

Premise 
The lives of three unmarried, jobless B Tech graduates and their roommate who is employed even though he is just an intermediate.

Cast and characters 
 Anu K Aniyan as George Mathukutty:  An Unemployed ambitious electrical engineer.
 Shabareesh Sajjin as Lolan: A humorous character who likes to play around. He is a trouble maker and often the entire group had to suffer the consequences. 
 Binoy John as Shibu: A serious and mature character. He is an intermediate and is the only one among the group who has a job. Shibu's three roommates mainly depend on his income.
 Anand Mathews as Shambhu: Shambhu is a computer nerd and an app developer.
 Kiran Viyyath: Krishna Kumar aka K.K.
 Jeevan Stephen as Francis
 Arjun Ratan as Scene Britto
 Unni Mathews as Hari
 Krishna Chandran as Baby

Guest appearances 
 Aju Varghese as Adv. Prahlad Iyyer
 Saniya Iyappan as Aswathy Achu

Episodes

References

External links
 

Malayalam-language web series
Indian drama web series